Nauman Habib (13 September 1979 – 11 October 2011) was a Pakistani cricketer. He played for Khan Research Laboratories, Peshawar Cricket Association, and the Peshawar Panthers. Habib played 63 first-class matches, 30 List A matches and 3 Twenty20 matches. He was found murdered on 11 October 2011, having been reported missing two days earlier.

See also
List of solved missing person cases
List of unsolved murders

References

External links
 

1979 births
2010s missing person cases
2011 deaths
Cricketers from Peshawar
Formerly missing people
Khan Research Laboratories cricketers
Khyber Pakhtunkhwa cricketers
Male murder victims
Missing person cases in Pakistan
Pakistani cricketers
Pakistani murder victims
Pakistan Telecommunication Company Limited cricketers
People murdered in Pakistan
Peshawar cricketers
Peshawar Panthers cricketers
Unsolved murders in Pakistan